Sherriden May (born August 10, 1973) is a former American football running back. He played for the New York Jets from 1995 to 1996.

References

1973 births
Living people
American football running backs
Idaho Vandals football players
New York Jets players